Avni Zogiani (born 5 July 1970 in Pristina, Kosovo) is an Albanian activist, critic, lawyer, journalist and chairman of the civil society Çohu.

Early life and education
Zogiani is executive director of the Organization for Democracy and Anti-Corruption "Arise" since its founding in 2005 and the Center for Investigative Reporting, a leading organization in Kosovo to create a civil society front in the fight against organized crime and political corruption.

Education and career
Zogiani completed his studies at the University of Prishtina in 1998. During the years 2002-2003 he attended a professional development year in the School of Journalism at University of Indiana in Indianapolis, United States, while during 2004-2005 pursued a Master of Arts in Sussex European Institute, University of Sussex.

Journalism career
During 2004-2007 he worked in Kohavision as an investigative journalist, senior reporter, editor and columnist. During 2000-2002 he worked for the online magazine Transitions Online in Prague, and he also worked for the online magazine Stringer in Kosovo.

2014 students protest in Kosovo

Filmography

Documentaries
2011 - Newborn

References

http://www.imdb.com/name/nm4277980/

1970 births
Albanian journalists
Kosovan critics
Living people